Basri (also Romanized as Başrī) is a village in Akhtachi-ye Gharbi Rural District, in the Central District of Mahabad County, West Azerbaijan Province, Iran. At the 2006 census, its population was 59, in 24 families.

Basri Village is a Leper Colony.

References 

Populated places in Mahabad County